"Catchy Song" is a song by American DJ and producer Dillon Francis, featuring guest vocals from rappers T-Pain and Alaya High (the latter credited on the soundtrack release as her stage name That Girl Lay Lay). The song became the main theme to the 2019 Warner Bros. Pictures film The Lego Movie 2: The Second Part, as it is written by Jon Lajoie, and produced by Francis.

The song is notable for its repeated lyric, "This song's gonna get stuck inside your... (3x) ...head!" As the name implies, it is infectiously catchy, an idea joked about in the movie.

Production
Following the same attempt to create an earworm of a song with "Everything Is Awesome" from The Lego Movie, the producers of the film created the similar song for the sequel, which principally features the repeated phrase "This song's gonna get stuck inside your head!" for most of the song. According to Lajoie, he found that "Everything is Awesome" was "annoyingly catchy", and the only way that they could outdo that was "Dial the 'annoying' up to 11!". T-Pain sang the song's chorus, while Alaya High primarily sang the two verses and the first part of the final chorus.

Use in film
The first use of the song in The Lego Movie 2: The Second Part is in a scene in which most of the film's characters are subjected to the song and all except Lucy dance to it, while simultaneously the denizens of Harmony Town sing it to Emmet and Rex. Lucy/Wildstyle avoids being "brainwashed" by the song by breaking one of the speakers and using some of its pieces to build earmuffs for herself before escaping via air ducts, while Emmet and Rex escape in a similar fashion.

The song is briefly sampled in the unhappy reprise of "Everything Is Awesome" ("Everything's Not Awesome") when Lucy proclaims that the song is "gonna get stuck inside your heart", a proclamation made to bring back the hope of defeating Rex and restoring harmony.

The song also plays in its entirety during the first third of the end crawl during the closing credits.

Charts

Weekly charts

Year-end charts

References

External links 
 

2019 singles
Lego music
The Lego Movie (franchise)
T-Pain songs
Dillon Francis songs
Songs written for films

American synth-pop songs